Jakub Flek (born December 24, 1992) is a Czech professional ice hockey left winger who plays for HC Karlovy Vary of the Czech Extraliga.

Flek first played for Karlovy Vary during the 2013–14 Czech Extraliga season and has played 184 games for the team up to the 2019–20 season. He has also played on loan with HC Baník Sokolov and HC Dukla Jihlava.

Career statistics

International

References

External links

1992 births
Living people
HC Baník Sokolov players
Czech ice hockey left wingers
HC Dukla Jihlava players
HC Karlovy Vary players
People from Mariánské Lázně
Sportspeople from the Karlovy Vary Region